Borbeto Jam is the sixth studio album by the jazz band Borbetomagus. It was released in 1985 through Cadence Jazz Records.

Track listing

Personnel 
Adapted from Borbeto Jam liner notes.

Borbetomagus
 Don Dietrich – saxophone
 Donald Miller – electric guitar
 Jim Sauter – saxophone

Additional musicians
 Milo Fine – piano, clarinet, drums, whistle
 Tristan Honsinger – cello, voice
 Toshinori Kondo – trumpet
 Peter Kowald – bass guitar
Production and additional personnel
 Larry Alexander – recording
 Katherine Joyce – cover art
 Tom Lord – executive producer
 Bob Rusch – producer

Release history

References

External links 
 Borbeto Jam at Discogs (list of releases)

1985 albums
Borbetomagus albums
Cadence Jazz Records albums